John Deare (26 October 1759, Liverpool – 17 August 1798, Rome) was a British neo-classical sculptor. His nephew Joseph (1803–1835) was also a sculptor.

Life
Born to a jeweller in Liverpool, John Deare enrolled at the Royal Academy Schools in 1777, where he won a gold medal for a Miltonic subject (1780). Meanwhile he also served an apprenticeship to the London carver Thomas Carter from 1776 to 1783, before setting up on his own. He continued to produce work for his old master as well as for John Bacon and John Cheere. Independent commissions included the reliefs The War of Jupiter and the Titans in plaster for Whitton Park's pediment and The Good Samaritan (post-1782) for the Liverpool Dispensary. Deare was himself admired by his contemporaries, particularly by Joseph Nollekens. However, his only surviving early works are those he produced to be made in ceramic by Derby for clocks by Benjamin Vulliamy.

The Royal Academy gave him a pension for a three-year stay in Rome (on the condition he sent back a work to the RA's annual exhibition). Starting in 1785, he drew the classical sculpture collections at (among others) the Villa Albani and the Capitoline Museums. He set up an artistic circle including Robert Fagan, Charles Grignion the Younger, Samuel Woodforde and George Cumberland. For his exhibition piece he modelled in plaster The Judgement of Jupiter (with over 20 figures and emulating history painting of the time, it was the largest 18th-century relief by a British artist) but the Academy argued with him over its size and it was not sent to London. A marble version however, was commissioned by Sir Richard Worsley in 1788, and is now in the Los Angeles County Museum of Art. He produced a relief of Edward and Eleanor (drawn from a play by James Thomson) for Sir George Corbett and commanded a price of £700 for a statue of Apollo for Lord Berwick. He also acted as an agent for Thomas Hope and the Earl of Bristol in their acquisition of works by his friend John Flaxman and for Henry Blundell and John Latouche in acquiring works by Canova, all four of whom also bought works by Deare.

After his pension expired he found that he was so in demand in Rome that he was able to settle there and finance himself through carving copies of classical sculptures for British Grand Tourists, restoring classical sculptures for collectors and by producing chimneypieces for patrons. This last included one at Frogmore House for the Prince of Wales (employing Joseph Gandy and other architects for the purpose).

By his death in Rome in 1798 Deare had married an Italian woman, who he left with their children as a widow and for whose benefit Deare's friends such as Vincenzo Pacetti and Christopher Hewetson posthumously disposed of his studio contents. There are conflicting accounts of how he died. One story says that after sleeping on a block of marble hoping for inspiration he caught a chill and died. Another says that was thrown into a dungeon by a jealous French officer who had amorous intent towards his wife. Three days after his death he was buried in Rome's Protestant Cemetery.

Works
The Judgement of Jupiter
Edward and Eleanor (1786, marble version of 1790 for Sir Corbet Corbet now in a private collection).
Marine Venus, marble relief, purchased in 1787 by Sir Cecil Bisshop for Parham Park, Sussex, drawing on classical and 16th century Mannerist sculpture
Cupid and Psyche, marble (1791) for Thomas Hope (plaster version, Lyons House, co. Kildare)
The Landing of Julius Caesar in Britain (1791–4; V&A Museum, formerly  Stoke Park Stoke Poges, Buckinghamshire), the subject chosen by its commissioner John Penn
Portrait bust of John Penn (Eton College).

Classical copies
Apollo Belvedere, commissioned in 1792 for Attingham by Lord Berwick
Faun with a Kid (Prado Museum, Madrid), acquired by Lord Cloncurry (private collection)
Bust of Ariadne (c.1789, now in the Capitoline Museum, Rome), for John Latouche

References

External links

1759 births
1798 deaths
English sculptors
English male sculptors
Neoclassical sculptors
Artists from Liverpool
18th-century English male artists